César Vergara (born 14 January 1982) is a Chilean former footballer.

He played for Deportes Puerto Montt.

References
 
 

1982 births
Living people
Chilean footballers
Unión Española footballers
Rangers de Talca footballers
Provincial Osorno footballers
Deportes Concepción (Chile) footballers
Chilean Primera División players
Primera B de Chile players
Sportspeople from Concepción, Chile
Association football defenders